Wadgaon Gupta is a village in Ahmednagar district, near Ahmednagar city in India.The sina river flows through this village

References

Villages in Ahmednagar district